Nicolae Andrei (born 8 December 1939) is a Romanian ice hockey player. He competed in the men's tournament at the 1964 Winter Olympics.

References

1939 births
Living people
Olympic ice hockey players of Romania
Ice hockey players at the 1964 Winter Olympics
Sportspeople from Miercurea Ciuc